The South Africa cricket team toured Australia in October and November 2018 to play three One Day Internationals (ODIs) and one Twenty20 International (T20I) match. Ahead of the ODI series, a 50-over practice match took place at the Manuka Oval in Canberra. Ahead of the T20I match, a 20-over practice match took place in Brisbane. In April 2018, it was confirmed that the Carrara Stadium would host its first ever international cricket match.

Prior to the tour, Aaron Finch replaced Tim Paine as captain, and  both Josh Hazlewood and Alex Carey were appointed joint vice-captains of the Australia ODI cricket team. The final ODI of the series was the 600th to be played by the South African team. South Africa won the ODI series 2–1. The one-off T20I match was reduced to ten overs per side due to rain, with South Africa winning the fixture by 21 runs.

Squads

Ahead of the tour, JP Duminy and Hashim Amla were both ruled out of South Africa's squads due to injury. Ahead of the second ODI, Ben McDermott was added to Australia's ODI squad as cover for Shaun Marsh.

Tour matches

50 over match: Prime Minister's XI vs South Africa

20 over match: Cricket Australia XI vs South Africa

ODI series

1st ODI

2nd ODI

3rd ODI

T20I match

Only T20I

References

External links
 Series home at ESPN Cricinfo

2018 in Australian cricket
2018 in South African cricket
International cricket competitions in 2018–19
South African cricket tours of Australia
2018–19 Australian cricket season